A Thousand and One Hands (French: Les Mille et Une Mains, Arabic: Alf yad wa yad en arabe) is a 1973 Moroccan film directed by Souheil Ben-Barka. It was screened abroad and received critical acclaim despite being censored in Morocco.

Synopsis 
In Marrakech, veteran dyer Moha and his son Miloud carry bundles of woolen thread. Thus begins the painstaking work of weaving carpets destined for sale abroad, and the hard work of the men, women and girls. With hardly any dialogue, the film illustrates the inhuman conditions of workers and the class struggle in Morocco in the 1970s.

Cast 
 Abdou Chaibane 
 Aissa Elgazi
 Mimsy Farmer
Ahmed Si

Awards and accolades 
 Georges Sadoul Prize, Paris (1973)
 Etalon de Yennenga - FESPACO (1973)

References

External links 
 

1973 films
Moroccan drama films
1970s Arabic-language films
1973 drama films